The 2015 EBSA European Snooker Championships was an amateur snooker tournament that took place from 2 June to 13 June 2015 in Prague, Czech Republic  It was the 24th edition of the EBSA European Snooker Championships and also doubles as a qualification event for the World Snooker Tour.

The tournament was won by 9th seed Michael Wild who defeated Jamie Clarke 7–4 in the final. As a result, Wild was given a two-year card on the professional World Snooker Tour for the 2015/2016 and 2016/2017 seasons.

Results

Round 1
Best of 7 frames

References

2015 in snooker
Snooker amateur tournaments
Sports competitions in Prague
2015 in Czech sport
International sports competitions hosted by the Czech Republic
2010s in Prague
June 2015 sports events in Europe